Boris Igorevich Krasnov (born 23 July 1997) is a Russian taekwondo athlete. In 2012, Krasnov won gold at the World Youth Championships in Sharm-el-Sheikh. His best senior result to date was winning gold at the 2017 Summer Universiade, defeating 2016 Olympic champion Ahmad Abughaush in the semifinals.

References

External links 
Profile on Taekwondodata

Living people
Russian male taekwondo practitioners
1997 births
Sportspeople from Tolyatti
Universiade medalists in taekwondo
Universiade gold medalists for Russia
Medalists at the 2017 Summer Universiade
21st-century Russian people